J64 may refer to:
 Augmented tridiminished icosahedron
 , a minesweeper of the Royal Canadian Navy
 LNER Class J64, a British steam locomotive class